The women's 48 kilograms event at the 2015 World Weightlifting Championships was held on 20 and 21 November 2015 in Houston, United States.

Schedule

Medalists

Records

 Nurcan Taylan's world record was rescinded in 2021.

Results

References

External links
Results 

2015 World Weightlifting Championships
World